The Ironman Australia is a yearly triathlon in May covering the Ironman distance (3.8 km swimming, 180 km cycling and 42.195 km running) on the East Coast of Australia. 

The event has been held in Port Macquarie, NSW since 2006 and prior to that it was held in Forster / Tuncurry area.

Organization
The race is organised by Ironman Oceania and is sanctioned by Triathlon Australia.

The current Race Director is Kieran Burgess.

Route
The transition area is located in Westport Park. The swim course includes a single lap at the mouth of the Hastings River including two crossings of the flood control weir via stairs erected for the event at the northern end of the course. The bike course consists of two laps from transition, south on Pacific & Ocean Drives to Camden Haven and then returning to the Central Business District of Port Macquarie for the turn-around between laps. The run course consists of four laps first heading east out of transition to pass along the iconic rock wall before heading north to Settlement Point and finishing in the historic Town Green Precinct of Port Macquarie.

Winners list

Ironman Australia in Port Macquarie

Ironman Australia in Forster/Tuncurry

Tooheys Great Lakes International Triathlon in Forster/Tuncurry

References

1985 establishments in Australia
Recurring sporting events established in 1985
Triathlon competitions
Sports competitions in Australia
Australia